Rosanne Cash is the self-titled debut album of American country music artist Rosanne Cash, released on December 15, 1978. The album was never issued in the U.S. It was her only album for the German based Ariola Records, and the first to feature Rodney Crowell, who went on to produce Cash's other albums. After that album's release, Cash signed contracts with Columbia Records in 1979.

Track listing
"Baby, Better Start Turnin' Em Down" (Rodney Crowell) – 4:06
"Take Me, Take Me" (Keith Sykes) – 3:40
"So Fine" (Jim Gribble) – 3:20
"Thoughts from the Train" (Yigal Bashan, Lucy Neale) – 3:45
"Understand Your Man" (Johnny Cash) – 3:23
"I'm Ragged But I'm Right" (George Jones) – 2:45
"Anybody's Darlin' (Anything But Mine)" (Rodney Crowell) – 5:10
"Feelin' Blue" (John C. Fogerty) – 3:59
"We Can Do What We Like" (Rosanne Cash) – 3:43
"Baby We Can Be Friends" (Rosanne Cash) – 2:32
"Can I Still Believe in You" (Rosanne Cash) – 5:35

Personnel
Rosanne Cash - acoustic guitar, vocals
Jerry McKeun - acoustic and electric guitar, electric piano
Mats Björkland - acoustic and electric guitar
Frank Baum - pedal steel
Rodney Crowell - acoustic guitar, arrangements on "So Fine", "Understand Your Man" and "Can I Still Believe in You"
Sigi Schwab - acoustic guitar, banjo
Bee Spears, Dave King - bass
Charly Ricanek - piano, Fender Rhodes, celesta, synthesizer, arrangements
Buck White - piano, mandolin
Jerry Kroon, Keith Forsey - drums
Joseph Spector,  - percussion
Giuseppe Solera - harmonica
Hannes Beckmann - electric violin
Siegfried Meinecke - viola
Franz Fischer - cello
Timothy Touchton - harmony vocals
Carlene Carter, Larry Willoughby, Wolly Emperhoff - backing vocals
Technical
Frank von dem Bottlenberg, Harry Thumann, Zeke Lund - engineer
Mal Luker - mixing

1978 debut albums
Rosanne Cash albums
Ariola Records albums
Albums produced by Rodney Crowell